Steffi Graf was the defending champion, but chose not to participate. Jennifer Capriati won the title, defeating Katerina Maleeva in the finals, 6–2, 6–3.

Seeds 
The top eight seeds received a bye to the second round.

Draw

Finals

Top half

Section 1

Section 2

Bottom half

Section 1

Section 2

References

External links 
 ITF tournament edition details

Canadian Open
Canadian Open (tennis)
Open
 Canadian Open